Microstylum is a genus of robber flies in the family Asilidae. There are at least 130 described species in Microstylum.

See also
 List of Microstylum species

References

Further reading

External links

 

Asilidae genera
Articles created by Qbugbot